Black Bridge is an independent 2006 comedy-drama film from Canada and was written and directed by Kevin Doherty. It was shot (and re-shot) over the course of 2002 and 2003 with practically no budget. The film is a period piece that takes place in May 1984 Canada during the height of heavy metal music popularity. The film's soundtrack featured music by Winnipeg metal acts Lawsuit and Labyrinth along with Canadian metal acts Goat Horn, Betrayer, Kick Axe, Thor, Anvil, Helix, Brighton Rock, Trained Bears and the American group Geronimo!

Cast
Adam Smoluk as Adrian Downing
Raimey Gallant as Kathy Osbourne
Jason Malloy as Clive DuBrow
Mike Silver as Eddie Elliot
Jennifer Pudavick as Tracey Roth
James Clayton as Brian 'Gomer' Young (as Clayton Champagne)
Orlando Carriera as Sammy Rhoades
Natasha Reske-Naurocki as Lisa
David Stuart Evans as Mr. Simmons
Spencer Maybee as Vinny Gay
Mike Cunningham as Bruce 'Pug' Pugnowski
Zenon Hudyma as Blackie
Kierin Kocourek as Mikey Gay
Kelly Wolfman as Patricia Butler
Alan MacKenzie as Neil Ward

Reception 
Canuxploitation was generally positive in their review of Black Bridge, writing "Though a few false acting notes are hit, Black Bridge still manages to weave several naturally unfolding stories into a decisively emotional narrative, even working in some very funny flashes of dark humor. A worthy effort deserving of a goat-horn salute or two." The Winnipeg Free Press was mixed in their review, stating "I can't really give Black Bridge a big thumbs-up, but I can throw it a few devil-horns for the crazed fervour with which it descends into high school headbanging culture, circa 1984."

References

External links
 
 
 Review at We Love Metal
 Review at 1000 Bullets

2006 films
Canadian black-and-white films
Canadian comedy-drama films
English-language Canadian films
2000s English-language films
Films set in Winnipeg
Films shot in Winnipeg
2006 comedy-drama films
2000s Canadian films